Adam Joseph Javier Mazarei (born December 13, 1982) is an American basketball coach, currently working as an assistant coach for the Vanderbilt Commodores of the Southeastern Conference.

Early life 
Mazarei was raised by his parents Mahdi and Linda. He attended Westlake High School in Ventura County, California, where he played as a point guard for the school's basketball team.

Mazarei graduated from University of Redlands in 2006 with major in psychology. Played basketball at Redlands under coach Gary Smith. In senior season he led  league in assists and led the country in all divisions of the NCAA in Assist to Turnover ratio (5:1). He holds a master's degree in athletic administration and coaching from Concordia University,

Coaching career 
Mazarei started coaching at his alma mater Westlake High School. He was named Ventura County Coach of the Year for all Freshman Coaches in the region.

Mazarei served as a player development coach at the IMPACT Basketball Academy in Las Vegas (2009–2013) where he helped train current NBA players such as Serge Ibaka, Kyle Lowry and Terrence Ross in addition to pre-draft rookies.

He served as an assistant and associate head coach for three years (2010–2013) at Moorpark College in California where his responsibilities included assisting and organizing all scouting, recruiting, practice and game plans as well as player development.

NBA 
Mazarei served as a player development assistant for the Memphis Grizzlies from 2010 to 2013, during which time he assisted with advance and pro personnel scouting.

On start of the 2016–17 season the Grizzlies added Mazarei to their coaching staff as assistant coach.

College 
On April 12, 2019, Mazarei was hired as an assistant coach for the Vanderbilt Commodores men's basketball team.

Personal life 
Mazarei is half Chinese, half Iranian descent. He has two younger brothers, Amir and Matthew, who also played college basketball. Amir also attended Redlands with him and was named NCAA Division III All-American 2nd team in his senior season.

References

1982 births
Living people
American people of Chinese descent
American people of Iranian descent
Basketball coaches from California
Concordia University alumni
Memphis Grizzlies assistant coaches
University of Redlands alumni
Basketball players from California
American men's basketball players
Point guards